The Viscount (French: Le vicomte règle ses comptes) is a 1967 crime film directed by Maurice Cloche and starring Kerwin Mathews, Sylvia Sorrente and Jean Yanne. The film's sets were designed by the art director Jean Douarinou. It was made as a co-production between France, Italy and Spain. Warner Brothers distributed the film in Britain and America.

Location shooting took place around Málaga, Sicily and Paris.

Cast
 Kerwin Mathews as Clint de la Roche, le Vicomte 
 Sylvia Sorrente as Lili Dumont 
 Jean Yanne as Billette 
 Fernando Rey as Marco Demoygne 
 Franco Fabrizi as Ramon 
 Maria Latour as Tania 
 Alain Saury as Vincento 
 Armand Mestral as Claude Peroux 
 Luis Dávila as Steve Heller 
 Álvaro de Luna as Jean 
 Pierre Massimi as Louis 
 Christian Kerville as Paul 
 Claude Le Lorrain
 Olga Bergamonti
 Pepe Martín as Manuel 
 Yvette Lebon as Claudia 
 Folco Lulli as Rico Barone

References

Bibliography 
 Alfred Krawc. International Directory of Cinematographers, Set- and Costume Designers in Film: France (from the beginnings to 1980). Saur, 1983.

External links 
 

1967 films
Italian crime films
Spanish crime films
French crime films
1967 crime films
1960s French-language films
Films directed by Maurice Cloche
1960s French films
1960s Italian films